This is a list of notable syndicalists, grouped by nationality.

American syndicalists
 Albert Parsons
 Bill Haywood
 Daniel De Leon
 Noam Chomsky
 Sam Dolgoff
 Helen Keller

French syndicalists
 Fernand Pelloutier leader of the French Bourses du Travail (Labour Exchange)
 Émile Pouget Co-leader of the Confédération Générale du Travail (CGT, founded in 1895)
 Hubert Lagardelle writer
 Georges Sorel
 Albert Camus

English syndicalists

 Tom Mann
 David Douglass NUM Leader
 Jack Tanner

Scottish syndicalists

 John Maclean, political activist and writer

Welsh syndicalists
 Noah Ablett, originator of the syndicalist pamphlet The Miners' Next Step
 Sam Mainwaring, orator and originator of the term 'anarcho-syndicalist'
 A. J. Cook

Irish syndicalists
 Jim Larkin
 James Connolly

German syndicalists

 Rudolf Rocker

Italian syndicalists
Alceste De Ambris
Michele Bianchi
Arturo Labriola
Agostino Lanzillo
Angelo Oliviero Olivetti
Paolo Orano
Sergio Panunzio

Spanish syndicalists
Pablo Iglesias
Francisco Ascaso
Buenaventura Durruti
Ángel Pestaña

See also

Anarchism
Anarcho-syndicalism
Consensus decision-making
Council communism
Deleonism
Democratic socialism
Eco-syndicalism
Fascist syndicalism
International Anarchist Congress of Amsterdam (1907)
IWA–AIT
National syndicalism
Libertarian socialism
National Confederation of Labor
Soviet (council)
Worker co-operative

Syndicalists